The Consensus 1988 College Basketball All-American team, as determined by aggregating the results of four major All-American teams.  To earn "consensus" status, a player must win honors from a majority of the following teams: the Associated Press, the USBWA, The United Press International and the National Association of Basketball Coaches.

1988 Consensus All-America team

Individual All-America teams

AP Honorable Mention:

Dana Barros, Boston College
Ricky Berry, San Jose State
Rex Chapman, Kentucky
Derrick Chievous, Missouri
Derrick Coleman, Syracuse
Hank Gathers, Loyola Marymount
Harvey Grant, Oklahoma
Skip Henderson, Marshall
Troy Lewis, Purdue
Dan Majerle, Central Michigan
Vernon Maxwell, Florida
Darryl Middleton, Baylor
Todd Mitchell, Purdue
Dyron Nix, Tennessee
Daren Queenan, Lehigh
Mitch Richmond, Kansas State
David Rivers, Notre Dame
Lionel Simmons, La Salle
Charles Smith, Pittsburgh
Rik Smits, Marist

Academic All-Americans
On February 28, 1988, GTE and CoSIDA announced the 1988 Academic All-America team, with Michael Smith headlining the University Division as the first men's college basketball Academic All-American of the Year.  The following is the 1987–88 GTE Academic All-America Men's Basketball Team (University Division) as selected by CoSIDA:

References

NCAA Men's Basketball All-Americans
All-Americans